The Journal of French Language Studies is a triannual peer-reviewed academic journal of linguistics covering the study of the French language. The journal was established in 1991 and is published by Cambridge University Press. Since 2004, one issue a year has been devoted to a particular theme.

References

External links
 

Language education in the United Kingdom
Linguistics journals
Publications established in 1991
Cambridge University Press academic journals
Triannual journals
Multilingual journals